Nam Mi-jung is a South Korean actress. She is known for her roles in dramas such as Snowdrop, Chip In, Woori the Virgin and Happiness. She also appeared in movies Futureless Things, Night Song and Hide and Seek.

Filmography

Television series

Film

Awards and nominations

References

External Links 
 
 

1968 births
Living people
21st-century South Korean actresses
South Korean television actresses
South Korean film actresses